"U R the Best Thing" is the debut single of Northern Irish musical group D:Ream, included on their first album, D:Ream On Volume 1 (1993). Originally a club hit released in 1992, the song has been remixed and re-released twice: in 1993 and in 1994. The 1994 version, also known as the Perfecto mix (by Paul Oakenfold and Steve Osborne), was most successful peaking at number three in Scotland, number four on the UK Singles Chart and number six in Ireland. It also peaked at number 13 on the Eurochart Hot 100. The 1993 version reached number one on the Billboard Hot Dance Club Play chart in the US. There were made three different music videos for the song. 

The track was voted "#1 Single Of The Year" by BBC Radio in 1993. In 1996, British magazine Mixmag included the song as number 96 in their "100 Greatest Dance Singles Of All Time" list.

Critical reception

1992 version
In 1992, British Lennox Herald described "U R the Best Thing" as a "house track with hypnotic song and certain club smash." Paul Mathur from Melody Maker wrote, "This sounds like nobody's business, has voices to turn nightingales green and according to the press release is, "as hard and stunning as a barren stepmother's slap". As metaphors go, that one is pretty Himalayan." Mixmag declared it as a "heart-stopping, piano pounding epic." A reviewer from Music Week called it "excellent", adding that it "mates well-crafted lyrics with some of this year's most essential samples and breaks". James Hamilton from the RM Dance Update stated that the track is "featuring some soaring support by D'borah Asher but made most exciting by its rippling vibes breaks, husky pop singer Peter Cunnah and DJ Al McKenzie's thumping and surging jangly house bounder".

1993 version
In 1993, Larry Flick from Billboard wrote, "The element that sets this record apart from the pack of wolves vying for recognition is that there is a real song tucked beneath the barrage of studio tricks and house beats. Here is one that doesn't lose any of its appeal once you stop twirling; the melody and lyrics stay with long after daylight. Props to the group's masterminds, Peter Cunnah and M Mackenzie, for going the extra mile and giving us something to feel and whistle to." Dave Sholin from the Gavin Report felt that "the pair blends a house sound with a just a taste of alternative." 

In his weekly UK chart commentary, James Masterton said, "More dance crossover only it is hard to describe it as such this time, with such a strong pop chorus and vocal. This one may well emulate the current success of Robin S and climb slowly and gradually into the 10." Andy Beevers from Music Week rated the song five out of five, complimenting the "superb new Morales mixes which have been getting a great dancefloor reaction". James Hamilton from the RM Dance Update described it as a "wriggling jangly canterer". Tim Southwell from Smash Hits gave the '93 version three out of five, noting that it "brings together flutes, piano and a drumbeat that shuffles along, creating a wobbly wah-wah effect." He also highlighted its "impressive and powerful" backing singer.

1994 version
In 1994, Scottish Dundee Courier picked "U R the Best Thing" as a "standout" track from the album. A reviewer from Music & Media wrote, "Yep, it's them again with their umpteenth rerelease. Remixed by Paul Oakenfold and Steve Osborne, it's another step up the stairs to stardom for the pop dance duo." The magazine's Maria Jimenez constated that the track's "longevity is assisted by this wide spectrum of new remixes". Alan Jones from Music Week rated the remix four out of five, calling it "a bankable follow up" to their number one hit, "Things Can Only Get Better". John Kilgo from The Network Forty commented, "Looking for a flavorful uptempo dance track? Look no further than this techno jammer that has scored the #1 position on the dance charts." 

In an retrospective review, Pop Rescue noted the "big" vocals from D’Borah Asher and the house piano, adding that "this song does feel somewhat more mellow though, giving Peter plenty of space to show off his vocals in the verse." Tim Jeffery from the RM Dance Update said, "These new Perfecto mixes keep the attractive flute part while adding strings and a  piano sound to make the song an anthem once again. Stylish, commercial and probably a hit second time around." Another editor, James Hamilton, deemed it a "attractive huskily crooned throbbing 122.9bpm" Perfecto remix. Adam Higginbotham from Select described it as a "perfect feelgood pop-dance record" and felt it "left no one in any doubt about where they were coming from." Pete Stanton from Smash Hits gave it four out of five, writing, "It's as good now as it was then with its anthem-like chorus and plinkety pianos. This is even better than "Things Can Only Get Better"." Darren Ressler from Vibe viewed it as a "buoyant" smash.

Music video
There were made three different music videos for the song, one for each year; in 1992, 1993 and 1994. The 1994 version was directed by German director Marcus Nispel and filmed in New York City. It features Peter Cunnah and the band performing the song at a rooftop, in an urban setting, surrounded by skyscrapers. Sometimes Cunnah performs while hanging from a crane, other times he sends paper planes. Soap bubbles are bubbling in the air and occasionally old newspapers are seen blowing by in the wind over the rooftop. The video was later published by Vevo on YouTube in November 2018 and as of December 2022, it had generated more than 1.1 million views. 

Personnel
Director: Marcus Nispel
Director of photography: Jamie Rosenberg:  
Producer and executive-producer: Anouk Frankel 
Producer and executive-producer: Brendan Heath 
Supervising producer: Shelly Bloch

Track listings
 CD maxi, Europe (1992)
 "U R the Best Thing" – 4:09
 "U R the Best Thing" (D:Ream dub) – 6:33
 "U R the Best Thing" (Sasha full mix) – 7:55
 "U R the Best Thing" (12-inch mix) – 6:18
 "U R the Best Thing" (accapella) – 4:57
 "U R the Best Thing" (Slow Hand Super Summer Disco mix) – 6:20

 CD maxi, Europe (1993)
 "U R the Best Thing" – 4:08
 "U R the Best Thing" (D:Ream extended 12-inch mix) – 6:13
 "U R the Best Thing" (Sasha full edit) – 6:52
 "U R the Best Thing" (Def Klub mix) – 7:56
 "U R the Best Thing" (Mo Bass Part II) – 11:12
 "U R the Best Thing" (Def radio mix) – 3:37

 CD maxi, Europe (1994)
 "U R the Best Thing" (Perfecto radio mix) – 4:05
 "U R the Best Thing" (Original 7-inch mix) – 4:05
 "U R the Best Thing" (Perfecto mix) – 6:43
 "U R the Best Thing" (Sasha full mix) – 7:58
 "U R the Best Thing" (Mo Bass Pt II) – 11:13
 "U R the Best Thing" (D·Ream extended mix) – 5:50

Charts

Weekly charts

Year-end charts

Release history

References

1992 songs
1992 debut singles
1993 singles
1994 singles
D Ream songs
Magnet Records singles
Music videos directed by Marcus Nispel
Music Week number-one dance singles
Songs written by Peter Cunnah